Kokandia is a monotypic genus of hymenopteran insects of the family Eulophidae. The only known species Kokandia salsolicola is a parasitoid of gall midges belonging to the family Cecidomyiidae which use plants of the goosefoot genus Salsola as hosts.

References

Key to Nearctic eulophid genera
Universal Chalcidoidea Database

Eulophidae